Marin Držić (also Marino Darza or Marino Darsa; 1508 – 2 May 1567) was a Croatian writer from Republic of Ragusa. He is considered to be one of the finest Renaissance playwrights and prose writers of Croatian literature.

Life 
Born into a large and well to do family (with 6 sisters and 5 brothers) in Dubrovnik, Držić was trained and ordained as a priest — a calling very unsuitable for his rebel temperament. Marin's uncle was another famous author Džore Držić. Ordained in 1526, Držić was sent in 1538 to Siena in Tuscany to study the Church Canon Law, where his academic results were average. Thanks to his extroverted and warm personality, he is said to have captured the hearts of his fellow students and professors, and was elected to the position of rector of the university. Losing interest in his studies, Marin returned to the Dubrovnik Republic in 1543.

Here he became an acquaintance of Austrian adventurer Christoph Rogendorf, then at odds with Vienna court. After a brief sojourn in Vienna, Držić came back to his native city. Other vagabond exploits followed: a connection with a group of Dubrovnik outlaws, a journey to Constantinople and a brief trip to Venice. After a career as an interpreter, scrivener and church musician, he even became a conspirator. Convinced that Dubrovnik was governed by a small circle of elitist aristocracy bent to tyranny, he tried to persuade in five letters (four of which survive) the powerful Medici family in Florence to help him overthrow the government in his home town; they did not respond. Marin died suddenly in Venice on 2 May 1567. He was buried in the Church of St. John and Paul.

Works 
Držić's works cover many fields: lyric poetry, pastorals, political letters and pamphlets, and comedies. While his pastorals (Tirena, Venera i Adon and Plakir) are still highly regarded as masterful examples of the genre, the pastoral has, as artistic form, virtually vanished from the scene.

However, his comedies are among the best in European Renaissance literature. As with other great comedy writers like Lope de Vega, Ben Jonson or Molière, Držić's comedies are full of exuberant life and vitality, celebrating love, liberty and sincerity and mocking avarice, egoism and petty tyrants — both in the family and in the state. His best-known comedies include:
 Pomet (1548 or 1553) - some historiographers argue that Pomet is indeed Marin's oldest play, his debut, while others disagree.  The fact that it's lost makes it harder to classify it.
 Novela od Stanca (1550)
 Dundo Maroje (1551 or 1556) - arguably Marin's most famous play. It was also played in some international theatres.
 Skup (1554) - thematically similar to Plautus' Aulularia and Molière's The Miser

The gallery of young lovers, misers, cuckolds, adventurers, senile tyrants, painted with the gusto of buoyant idiom that exemplifies richness of Croatian in the Renaissance period has remained the pillar of Croatian high comedy theatre ever since.

Legacy

Since its independence Croatia has awarded the Marin Držić Award for dramatic work. The Croatian Parliament also declared 2008 the Year of Marin Držić, as it is the 500th anniversary of his birth. An avenue in Zagreb is named after him. In Draškovićeva street (centre of Zagreb) there is a scenical stage named after Marin's nickname Vidra. Nicknames are given for various reasons. In Croatian the word vidra can also refer to a person who is perfidious and resourceful.

See also
 Libertas (film)

References

External links 
 Marin Držić Museum

1508 births
1567 deaths
People from the Republic of Ragusa
Croatian dramatists and playwrights
16th-century Croatian people
People from Dubrovnik
Ragusan writers